Senator Locke may refer to:

David H. Locke (1927–2019), Massachusetts State Senate
Francis Locke Jr. (1776–1823), elected as a U.S. Senator from North Carolina in 1814, but resigned before qualifying
James William Locke (1837–1922), Florida State Senate
John Locke (Massachusetts politician) (1764–1855), Massachusetts State Senate
Mamie Locke (born 1954), Virginia State Senate
Matthew Fielding Locke (1824–1911), Texas State Senate
Matthew Locke (U.S. Congress) (1730–1801), North Carolina State Senate
Orrin Wiley Locke (1859–1951), Vermont State Senate